If I Find You, is an Armenian drama television series. The series premiered on ATV on January 8, 2017. Since then, the series air every workday at 21:00.
Mostly, the series takes place in Yerevan, Armenia.

References

External links
 

Armenian drama television series
Armenian-language television shows
2010s drama television series
ATV (Armenia) original programming
2017 Armenian television series debuts
2010s Armenian television series